Streptocaulon is a genus of plants in the family Apocynaceae, first described as a genus in 1834. It is native to India, China and Southeast Asia.

Species

formerly included
moved to other genera (Calotropis, Cryptolepis, Myriopteron, Periploca, Strophanthus, Vincetoxicum)

References

 
Apocynaceae genera